The 2007–08 Second Division season was the thirteenth season of the Second Division in a ten team format.

The following teams competed: Airdrie United, Alloa Athletic, Ayr United, Berwick Rangers, Brechin City, Cowdenbeath, Peterhead, Queen's Park, Raith Rovers and Ross County.

The team which finished first were automatically promoted to the First Division, the teams which finished second, third and fourth were entered into the First division play-offs with the team which finished second bottom of the First Division for a place in the 2008–09 First Division.

The team which finished bottom were automatically relegated to the Third Division and the team which finished second bottom were entered into the Second division play-offs with the teams which finished second, third and fourth in the Third Division for a place in the 2008–09 Second Division.

Promotion and relegation from 2006–07

First and second divisions
Relegated from First Division to Second Division
 Ross County
 Airdrie United (via play-offs)

Promoted from Second Division to First Division
 Greenock Morton
 Stirling Albion (via play-offs)

Second and third divisions
Relegated from Second Division to Third Division
 Stranraer
 Forfar Athletic (via play-offs)
Promoted from Third Division to Second Division
 Berwick Rangers
 Queens Park (via play-offs)

Events

15 March:  East Fife confirm their promotion to the Second Division as Third Division champions with a 3–0 victory over East Stirlingshire.

29 March: Berwick Rangers are relegated from the Second Division after a 2–2 draw with Peterhead.
5 April: Ross County win promotion to the First Division as Champions after a 4–0 win over already-relegated Berwick Rangers and second place Airdrie United lose 2–1 to Brechin City.
8 April: Stirling Albion are relegated from the First Division to the Second Division after a 1–0 defeat to Partick Thistle.
10 May: Arbroath are promoted to the Second Division after a 2–1 aggregate win over Stranraer in the Second Division play-off final. Cowdenbeath, who were beaten by Arbroath in the semi-finals, are relegated to the Third Division.
10 May: Clyde retain their First Division status after defeating Airdrie United 3–0 on aggregate in the First Division play-off final.
29 May: First Division play-off runners-up Airdrie United are promoted to the First Division and Second Division play-off runners-up Stranraer are promoted to the Second Division following Gretna's demotion to the Third Division.

Table

Results
Teams play each other four times in this league. In the first half of the season each team plays every other team twice (home and away) and then do the same in the second half of the season.

First half of season

Second half of season

Top scorers

Source: The League Insider

Attendances

Source: The League Insider

Managerial changes

Monthly awards

Second Division play-offs

Semi-finals
The ninth placed team in the Second Division played the fourth placed team in the Third Division and third placed team in the Second Division played the second placed team in the Second Division. The play-offs were played over two legs, the winning team in each semi-final advanced to the final.

First legs

Second legs

Final
The two semi-final winners played each other over two legs, the home team in the 1st Leg was determined by a draw conducted on 1 April 2008. the winning team was awarded a place in the 2008–09 Second Division.

First leg

Second leg

References

Scottish Second Division seasons
2007–08 Scottish Football League
3
Scot